Mae Laborde (May 13, 1909 – January 9, 2012) was an American television and film actress, who began her career at the age of 93 and who was active until her death at age 102. She was best known for her appearances on Talkshow with Spike Feresten as well as portraying Gladys on It's Always Sunny in Philadelphia.

Background
Born in 1909 to Armenian parents Paul and Fereday Shamlian, in Fresno, Laborde arrived in Los Angeles at the height of the Great Depression. She met her husband, Nicholas Laborde, when he was the conductor on Los Angeles' old Red Car trolley line that she took home from work. She worked throughout her life, including a stint as bookkeeper for Lawrence Welk.

She began acting in 2002 in her 90s. She was also the subject of the featured article on Yahoo! on March 30, 2007. She appeared frequently on Talkshow with Spike Feresten.  Although not an acting gig, she appeared as an interviewee in the 1998 KCET production of "More Things That Aren't Here Anymore" hosted by veteran broadcaster Ralph Story.

In 2006 she appeared as Rosemary in the stoner horror film Evil Bong; ironically she appears in a behind-the-scenes interview expressing disapproval of cannabis use.

On Saturday, February 21, 2009, at 99 years old, she was awarded an honorary DTV converter box on Feresten's show in recognition of a comedy sketch she appeared in parodying the difficulties of installing a DTV converter box. Laborde died in 2012, aged 102, in Santa Monica, where she had lived for more than 80 years.

Family
Laborde outlived both her husband, Nicholas, and only child, Mrs. Shirley Miller.

References

External links

Video of Laborde at age 99 
 Obituary notice for Mae Laborde

1909 births
2012 deaths
21st-century American actresses
American centenarians
American film actresses
American people of Armenian descent
American television actresses
Actresses from Fresno, California
Actresses from Santa Monica, California
Ethnic Armenian actresses
Women centenarians